Christopher Erhardt (December 23, 1958 - December 3, 2012) was the Head of School - US Campuses for the Academy of Interactive Entertainment (AIE) from the time the school opened until his death.  From 1998-2007 he was the Associate Dean as well as V.P.-Production at  DigiPen Institute of Technology in the United States.

Biography
During the first 10 years of his life, Christopher Erhardt lived in Seattle, Washington, Detroit, Michigan, Riverside, California and Arcadia, California. He received a Bachelor of Science from the University of San Francisco, did graduate studies in psychology at Harvard University and acquired his master's degree in business from Capella University. In 2008 he completed his doctoral dissertation on video game players and demographic considerations and he was awarded his PhD from Cappella in 2010. Erhardt had over 19 years of experience in the Interactive Media Industry, where he was responsible for the production, design and product management of more than 22 titles with such publishers as Infocom, Activision, Electronic Arts, Infogrames, and Ocean Software of America.

Erhardt started working at an early age, putting himself through his undergraduate degree by odd jobs that ranged from magician to fur currier to line chef.  In the early 80s he was a product planner for companies such as Teledyne and other TEMPEST secured, MIS-based programming and project management tasks. He moved into the game industry in 1987 when Infocom requested his assistance in transitioning them from text-only games into graphical titles, leveraging his education in adolescent psychology to help them develop more compelling titles.

Erhardt was the President of ISOG based at Hyderabad, India until June 2009.

In December 2010, it was announced that Erhardt would be the head of the new Seattle branch of the Academy of Interactive Entertainment, which offers certificate programs and continuing education courses in digital media, game development, special effects and film production.

Games credited on

Academic career
In 1998, Erhardt transitioned into an academic environment and became a professor of Game Design and Production at DigiPen Institute of Technology.  In 2000 he was responsible for co-creating, with Alex Dunne, the student submissions category of the Game Developers Conference Independent Games Submission. In 2002 he moved to Beirut, Lebanon and spent two years teaching game software design and production to French and Arabic speaking computer engineering students. In 2005, upon his return to the US, he approached Valve to develop a level design program at DigiPen using their FPS engine.  In 2006 he worked with Microsoft Game Studios to bring XNA product development into DigiPen and inaugurated one of the first series of C#/XNA Game Studio Express product development programs at an accredited academic institution.

In 2007 Erhardt left DigiPen Institute of Technology and moved to India to head ISOG.

2005-2007 public presentations
 Co-presenter: GDC 2005 session ("The DigiPen Video Game Curriculum: From the Game to the Classroom")
 Moderator: PAX 2006 ("Gaming and Controversy")
 Moderator: November 2005 Game Producers Boot Camp
 Speaker: WritersUA 2006 ("User Assistance in Video Gaming")
 Panelist 2006 Games Initiative ('Applying Transferable Skill Sets')
 Panelist: 2006 E3 Expo ('The New Gamemaker: Trends in the trenches of game making and publishing')
 Member: Seattle Bureau of Trade-2007 World Cybergames Steering Committee
 Moderator: PAX 2007 ("Growing Old in Gaming", "Getting an education in Gaming")
 Presenter: VGEXPO 2007 ("Education and Gaming")
 Presenter: GDC 2011 session ("Surviving an Education at a Game School and Graduating Employable")

References

External links
 Moby Games
 Level 3 Red Couch Interview
 Gameshastra
obituary on gamasutra

1958 births
University of San Francisco alumni
Harvard Graduate School of Arts and Sciences alumni
Capella University alumni
Video game producers
2012 deaths